Humburi Senni, or Central Songhay, is a variety of Southern Songhai spoken in the Hombori region, straddling the Burkina–Mali border.

References

Songhay languages
Languages of Burkina Faso
Languages of Mali